The Marshall Islands Soccer Federation is the governing body of soccer in the Marshall Islands. Marshall Islands is not a member of its regional body, the Oceania Football Confederation (OFC), or FIFA, but is working on becoming a member in the next few years.

History
The federation was founded in 2020 with the purpose of introducing the sport to the nation which previously had no soccer history.  In May 2019 construction commenced on the Majuro Track and Field Stadium. Originally built as a venue for the 2023 Micronesian Games, the stadium would also serve as the home of football in the nation.

In December 2022 it was announced that the MISF had hired its first-ever Technical Director, British UEFA-licensed coach Lloyd Owers. Owers would be responsible for creating the soccer structure for the nation, including school and youth development programs up to the national teams.

In January 2023 the federation launched a GoFundMe campaign. The money raised would be used to purchase equipment to begin to grow the sport in the nation. As part of the campaign it was also announced that a national league was planned to kick off in 2023 with the national team playing a match by 2024.

See also 
 List of soccer clubs in the Marshall Islands

References

External links 
Official website
Official Facebook
Official Instagram
Official LinkedIn
Official Twitter

Association football governing bodies
Soccer in the Marshall Islands